The Zulfikar Ali Bhutto Agriculture College, Dokri, is an affiliated college of Sindh Agriculture University, Tandojam. This college is situated in Taluka Bakrani, district Larkana at an elevation of 164 ft. above mean sea level. Knowing the importance of agricultural education for the people of upper Sindh, Shaheed Mohtrama Benazir Bhutto announced the establishment of this college at a public gathering at Rice Research Institute Dokri in 1991. The college started functioning in September 1991, when some abandoned buildings of Rice Research Institute Dokri were renovated and handed over to Sindh Agriculture University.

The college later moved in 1997 to a newly constructed campus near Mihrabpur, Taluka Bakrani. This new college campus is located near Hyder Jatoi Railway Station and Mihrabpur village, 16 km south of Larkana city and 8 km north of Dokri along Larkana-Dokri via Mihrabpur road. The town of Bakrani is located 6 km to the east.

Departments
 Department of Agronomy
 Department of Plant Pathology
 Department of Plant Protection
 Department of Plant Breeding & Genetics
 Department of Economics
 Department of Islamic Studies
 Department of Statistics
 Department of Education Extension
 Department of Agricultural Engineering
 Department of Horticulture
 Department of Soil Science
 Department of Animal Husbandry & Veterinary Sciences

References

External links
 

Academic institutions in Pakistan
Memorials to Zulfikar Ali Bhutto